Harry George Lamborn (1 May 1915 – 21 August 1982) was a British Labour Party politician. He was a councillor from 1953, and a Member of Parliament (MP) from 1972 until his death in 1982.

Early political life
Lamborn was born in Dulwich. He was a member of Camberwell Borough Council from 1953 to 1965, including being mayor in 1963/4. He represented the Dulwich constituency on the London County Council (forerunner of the Greater London Council (GLC)) between 1958 and 1965. Lamborn was elected to the successor body, the Greater London Council in 1964 for the constituency of Southwark and was re-elected in 1967 and 1970. He was Deputy Chairman of the GLC from 1971 to 1972.

Member of Parliament
After Ray Gunter resigned from the House of Commons, Harry Lamborn was elected at a by-election in May 1972 for the constituency of Southwark. After his constituency was eliminated in boundary changes, he ran in the newly configured Peckham and was comfortably re-elected in the February 1974 general election when the Labour Party returned to office, albeit without a majority. He was Parliamentary Private Secretary (PPS) to the Chancellor of the Exchequer, Denis Healey from 1974 to 1979.

At the general election of 1979, the Labour Government was defeated, and a Conservative Party Government was elected under Margaret Thatcher. Lamborn was comfortably re-elected but with a reduced majority. Afterward, he announced he would not contend the next general election on health grounds.

Personal life and death
Lamborn married Lilian Ruth Smith in 1938, and they had three children. He died at a hospital in Eastbourne on 21 August 1982, and was succeeded in the Peckham constituency by Harriet Harman in a by-election later that year.

His name lives on in Harry Lamborn House, a block of sheltered flats for the elderly built by Southwark Council on Gervase Street, off the Old Kent Road in Peckham.

References

External links 
 

1915 births
1982 deaths
Labour Party (UK) MPs for English constituencies
Councillors in Greater London
Members of London County Council
Members of the Greater London Council
UK MPs 1970–1974
UK MPs 1974
UK MPs 1974–1979
UK MPs 1979–1983
Politics of the London Borough of Southwark